Firebases in the U.S.-involvement Vietnam War, were a type of military base, usually fire bases.

It may refer to:

 Firebase 6, Central Highlands
 Firebase Airborne, central South Vietnam
 Firebase Argonne, Quảng Trị Province
 Firebase Atkinson, southwest South Vietnam
 Firebase Bastogne, Thua Thien Province
 Firebase Berchtesgaden (Firebase Eagle's Nest) Thừa Thiên–Huế 
 Firebase Betty, Bình Thuận Province
 Firebase Bird, southern South Vietnam
 Firebase Birmingham, Thừa Thiên–Huế Province
 Firebase Checkmate, central South Vietnam
 Firebase Crook, southwest South Vietnam
 Firebase Cunningham, central South Vietnam
 Firebase Currahee, central South Vietnam
 Firebase Delta, Central Highlands
 Firebase Fuller, central South Vietnam
 Firebase Gela, southern South Vietnam
 Firebase Gio Linh, central South Vietnam
 Firebase Granite, central South Vietnam
 Firebase Hawk Hill, central South Vietnam
 Firebase Henderson, Quảng Trị Province
 Firebase Illingworth, southwest South Vietnam
 Firebase Jaeger, Dinh Tuong Province; involved in Operation Hop Tac I
 Firebase Jay, southwest South Vietnam
 Firebase Kate (Firebase White) Quang Duc Province; aka Landing Zone Kate
 Firebase Maureen, central South Vietnam
 Firebase Mile High, Central Highlands
 Firebase Neville, Quảng Trị Province
 Firebase Pedro, central South Vietnam
 Firebase Ripcord, Thua Thien Province
 Firebase Ross, Quảng Nam Province
 Firebase Russell, Quảng Trị Province
 Firebase Sarge (Firebase Dong Toan) central South Vietnam
 Firebase St. George, Central Highlands
 Firebase Thunder III, southern South Vietnam
 Firebase Tomahawk, central South Vietnam
 Firebase Veghel, central South Vietnam
 Firebase Vera, central South Vietnam

See also
 The Siege of Firebase Gloria (1989 film) Australian film

Vietnam War-related lists
Vietnam War military installations